Shah Shahid Sarwar is a Bangladesh Nationalist Party politician and the former Member of Parliament of Mymensingh-2.

Career
Sarwar was elected to parliament from Mymensingh-2 as a Bangladesh Nationalist Party candidate in 2001. Bangladesh Anti-Corruption Commission sued him on 10 November 2008 for concealing information about his wealth.

References

Bangladesh Nationalist Party politicians
Living people
8th Jatiya Sangsad members
People from Mymensingh District
Year of birth missing (living people)